Live in Montana is a 2012 live album by the Red Elvises. It is the first album in the group's history to be released under the moniker "Igor and Red Elvises", which the band has used since 2009. The album was first released to iTunes and other digital platforms in 2011. On September 29, 2012, it was released on CD.

Track listing 

Disc One

A Kegga Beer And Potato Chips
Three Alley Cats
Scorchi Chorniye
Gypsy Heart
Into The Sun
Love Rocket
Ticket To Japan
Ukrainian Dance #13
Strip Joint Is Closed
Sad Cowboy Song
Juliet
I Wanna See You Bellydance

Disc Two

7-40
Telephone Call From Istanbul
Me And My Baby
Drinking With Jesus
Don't Crucify Me
Better Than Cocaine
Winter Reggae
Flaming Cheese
Closet Disco Dancer
Band Introduction
Rocketman
My Love Is Killing Me
Lara's Wedding
Boogie On The Beach

Credits 

Recorded live in Montana, July 2010.

 Igor Yuzov - Vocals, guitar
 Oleg Bernov - Vocals, bass
 Milka Ramos - Vocals, guitar
 Elena Shemankova - Keyboards, accordion, vocals
 Kyle McCarter - Drums
 Jamie Vercauteren - packaging and design

References

External links 
 Official site

Red Elvises albums
2011 live albums